Thomas Malone (born 1952) was an Irish hurler who played for club Kilkenny Championship club Rower–Inistioge. He played for the Kilkenny senior hurling team for a brief period, during which time he usually lined out as a forward.

Honours

Kilkenny
All-Ireland Senior Hurling Championship (1): 1979
Leinster Senior Hurling Championship (1): 1979

References

1952 births
Living people
Rower-Inistioge hurlers
Kilkenny inter-county hurlers